Stanley Woodward Sr. (March 12, 1899 – August 17, 1992) was the White House Chief of Protocol under Franklin Delano Roosevelt and United States Ambassador to Canada under Harry S. Truman. He was a favorite social companion of FDR. Notable for his cautiousness in protecting Axis diplomats at the onset of World War II, he was also largely responsible for the introduction of black tie attire as acceptable formalwear. In his youth, he had an inclination for the Bishop's robe.

Born in Philadelphia, Woodward studied at Yale University. He later was a teacher for a year at Ya-Li. After his time teaching in China he took an extended tour through Malaya and India. On 20 October 1923 Woodward married Shirley Rutherfoord, who he had met when she visited Yale while a student at Vassar College and become more acquainted with while they were both teachers in China. Woodward then studied at the Ecole des Science Politiques in Paris.

He was a Foreign Service officer in Europe and Haiti from the mid-1920s to the mid-1930s before returning to Philadelphia as commissioner of Fairmount Park. He returned to the Foreign Service in 1937, serving first as assistant chief of protocol and then as chief of protocol at the State Department until his appointment as ambassador in 1950.

He served as the United States Ambassador to Canada (1950–1953), graduated from Yale University in 1922 and was a 1922 initiate into the Skull and Bones Society.

References

Contosta, David R. (1992). The Houstons and Woodwards of Chestnut Hill. University of Pennsylvania Press.  
 US Department of State

White House staff
1899 births
1992 deaths
Ambassadors of the United States to Canada
Yale University alumni
American expatriates in China
American expatriates in France
American expatriates in Haiti
United States Foreign Service personnel
Chiefs of Protocol of the United States
Democratic National Committee treasurers